UFC on FX: Browne vs. Bigfoot (also known as UFC on FX 5) was a mixed martial arts event held by the Ultimate Fighting Championship on October 5, 2012, at the Target Center in Minneapolis, Minnesota. It was the fifth UFC event broadcast live on FX.

Background
The event was originally expected to take place on September 7, 2012 at Bankers Life Fieldhouse in Indianapolis, Indiana.

Louis Gaudinot was expected to face Darren Uyenoyama at the event; however, Gaudinot was forced out of the bout with an injury and replaced by promotional newcomer Phil Harris.

A bout between Rob Broughton and Matt Mitrione, originally scheduled for UFC on Fox: Shogun vs. Vera and then briefly linked to this event, was scrapped after Broughton was forced out of the bout for a second time.

As a result of the cancellation of UFC 151, bouts between Jake Ellenberger vs. Jay Hieron, Danny Castillo vs. Michael Johnson, Shane Roller vs. Jacob Volkmann and Dennis Hallman vs. Thiago Tavares were rescheduled for this event.

The fight between John Dodson and Jussier Formiga was a title elimination bout with the winner being the first man to challenge the newly crowned UFC Flyweight champion, Demetrious Johnson.

A bout between Dennis Hallman and Thiago Tavares was expected to take place at this event; however, UFC officials cancelled the fight before the fighters stepped on the scale, because Hallman had missed weight significantly. Hallman was reportedly paid his show and win money, but was released from the organization.

Jeremy Stephens and Yves Edwards were scheduled to fight on this card, but the bout was cancelled due to Stephens being arrested on the day of the event for an assault charge that dates back to 2011.

Results

Bonus Awards
Fighters were awarded $40,000 bonuses.
Fight of the Night: Diego Nunes vs. Bart Palaszewski
Knockout of the Night: Michael Johnson
Submission of the Night: Justin Edwards

Reported Payout

The following is the reported payout to the fighters as reported to the Minnesota Office of Combative Sports. It does not include sponsor money and also does not include the UFC's traditional "fight night" bonuses.

Antonio Silva: $70,000 (no win bonus) def. Travis Browne: $20,000
Jake Ellenberger: $84,000 (includes $42,000 win bonus) def. Jay Hieron: $12,000
John Dodson: $30,000 (includes $15,000 win bonus) def. Jussier Formiga: $9,000
Justin Edwards: $20,000 (includes $10,000 win bonus) def. Josh Neer: $16,000
Michael Johnson: $28,000 (includes $14,000 win bonus) def. Danny Castillo: $25,000
Mike Pierce: $44,000 (includes $22,000 win bonus) def. Aaron Simpson: $25,000
Dennis Hallman: $54,000 vs. Thiago Tavares: $26,000^
Marcus LeVesseur: $12,000 (includes $6,000 win bonus) def. Carlo Prater: $10,000
Jacob Volkmann: $40,000 (includes $20,000 win bonus) def. Shane Roller: $25,000
Diego Nunes: $30,000 (includes $15,000 win bonus) def. Bart Palaszewski: $14,000
Darren Uyenoyama: $16,000 (includes $8,000 win bonus) def. Phil Harris: $8,000

^Fight did not take place as Hallman missed weight significantly. Both fighters were paid and Hallman was subsequently released from the organization.

See also
List of UFC events
2012 in UFC

References

External links
Official UFC past events page
UFC events results at Sherdog.com

UFC on FX
2012 in mixed martial arts
Mixed martial arts in Minnesota
Sports competitions in Minneapolis
2012 in sports in Minnesota
Events in Minneapolis